The Canyon River is a river in the Hudson Bay drainage basin in Unorganized Kenora District in northwestern Ontario, Canada. it is a tributary of the Wabigoon River.

Course
It takes in the right tributary Shrub Creek at the lake, upon which the settlements of Canyon and McIntosh are located. The river heads out of Canyon Lake at Outlet Bay, heads over several waterfalls including Sixty Two Foot Falls, and reaches its mouth at the Canyon Stretch on the Wabigoon River. From Favel Lake to the eastern tip of Canyon Lake, the river is paralleled by the Canadian National Railway transcontinental main line; Via Rail transcontinental Canadian trains travel on the line and stop at Canyon station.

Tributaries
Shrub Creek (right)

Communities
McIntosh
Canyon
Favel

See also
List of rivers of Ontario

References

Rivers of Kenora District
Tributaries of Hudson Bay